This is a list of television channels that broadcast for a Romanian language audience. Typically, non-Romanian content is subtitled, but maintains the original language soundtrack. Non-Romanian programming intended for children, is however, usually dubbed into Romanian. Regardless of intended audience, many shows receive a Romanian title, which is used in programme schedules.

Romania

Republic of Moldova

Other countries

Romanian
Lists of mass media in Romania